Robin O'Donoghue (born 1945) is an English sound engineer. He has been nominated for two Academy Awards in the category Best Sound. He has worked on over 130 films since 1966.

Selected filmography
 Gandhi (1982)
 Shakespeare in Love (1998)

References

External links

1945 births
Living people
English audio engineers
Best Sound BAFTA Award winners